Yoshinosegawa Dam is a gravity dam located in Fukui Prefecture in Japan. The dam is used for flood control. The catchment area of the dam is 24 km2. The dam impounds about 51  ha of land when full and can store 7800 thousand cubic meters of water. The construction of the dam was started on 1986.

References

Dams in Fukui Prefecture
1986 establishments in Japan